Duck Ugly (Couac, le vilain petit canard in French) is a 2000 French animated film co-produced by Millimages, TerraGlyph Productions, Ireland and Moro Studios, Barcelona. It was directed by Deane Taylor and Emmanuel Klotz.

The film is based on the fairy tale The Ugly Duckling by Hans Christian Andersen.

Cast 
 Gilles Coiffard as Raimuncho

English cast 
 Barbara Scaff as Duck Ugly
 Kim Broderick as Ladybird
 David Gasman as Simon
 Mike Marshall as Crooked Man
 Leslie Clark as Harry
 Helen Later as Trotsky
 Joe Sheridan as Hamlet

External links
 Duck Ugly on Millimages website
 Duck Ugly on the Big Cartoon Database
 Animation: A World History: Volume III: Contemporary Times
 SCHLINGEL International Film Festival
 

2000s children's fantasy films
2000 films
Irish animated films
2000 animated films
Films based on The Ugly Duckling
Irish children's films